The Decurion Corporation was an American corporation with headquarters in Los Angeles, California.  It was the parent company of Pacific Theatres and ArcLight Hollywood.

The Decurion Corporation is one of the three organizations studied throughout the book An Everyone Culture: Becoming a Deliberately Developmental Organization.

On April 12, 2021, its subsidiaries, Pacific Theatres and Arclight Cinemas announced they would not be reopening any of their theater locations after being closed since March 2020 due to the COVID-19 pandemic and said in a statement to the Los Angeles Times that, “After shutting our doors more than a year ago, today we must share the difficult and sad news that Pacific will not be reopening its ArcLight Cinemas and Pacific Theatres locations,” Pacific Theatres said in a statement. “This was not the outcome anyone wanted, but despite a huge effort that exhausted all potential options, the company does not have a viable way forward.”

References

External links

Film distributors of the United States
Entertainment companies based in California
Companies based in Los Angeles
American companies established in 1946
Entertainment companies established in 1946
1946 establishments in California
Companies that have filed for Chapter 7 bankruptcy
Companies disestablished due to the COVID-19 pandemic
2021 disestablishments in California
American companies disestablished in 2021